Patricia Gretchen Mann Brewin (born December 23, 1938), known as Gretchen, is a Canadian politician.

Brewin was born in Ottawa, Ontario to mother Marjorie Mann and Walter Mann on December 23, 1938. Gretchen has one sister, Susan Mann. She graduated from Glebe Collegiate and attended the University of Toronto for one year before marrying John Brewin in 1958. Her parents and parents-in-law were all active in the CCF (Cooperative Commonwealth Federation), and founding members of its new version, the NDP. Andrew Brewin, her father-in-law, was a member of parliament from 196 She and John had four children, Gillian (1959), Andrew (1960), Jennifer (1963), and Alison (1964) Brewin.

Brewin began her political career in Scarborough, Ontario, when she was elected to the school board in the 1960s. She and her family moved to Victoria in 1973 where husband John took a position with the NDP Barrett government. Brewin returned to university, receiving her BA in political science from the University of Victoria in 1978.

Brewin was elected to Victoria city council in 1979, then elected as Mayor of Victoria, British Columbia, Canada, in November 1985 and served until 1990. She was the first female mayor in the city's history.

Brewin served as a NDP Member of the Legislative Assembly of British Columbia for the riding of Victoria-Beacon Hill from 1991 to 2001. Brewin was speaker for the legislative assembly of BC from March 1998 to February 2000. From February to November 2000, she was a member of the provincial cabinet, serving as Minister for Children and Families.

Brewin and John divorced in 1991. She lives in Vancouver, British Columbia, and has 7 grandchildren, 3 stepgrandchildren, 2 step-great-grandchildren, and 1 great-grandchild.

References

Living people
1938 births
20th-century Canadian legislators
21st-century Canadian legislators
20th-century Canadian women politicians
21st-century Canadian women politicians
British Columbia New Democratic Party MLAs
Women government ministers of Canada
Mayors of Victoria, British Columbia
Members of the Executive Council of British Columbia
Politicians from Ottawa
Speakers of the Legislative Assembly of British Columbia
Women mayors of places in British Columbia
Women MLAs in British Columbia
Women legislative speakers